Gatina is a settlement in Kenya located in the Central Province.

References 

Populated places in Central Province (Kenya)